Down Home is the third album by the double bass player and cellist Sam Jones, recorded in 1962 and released on the Riverside label.

Reception

Scott Yanow of AllMusic wrote: "This is excellent hard bop-based music." The Penguin Guide to Jazz Recordings wrote that Jones "improvises against the grain of the orchestra to telling effect." Billboard called the album "a fine showcase for Jones."

Track listing
All compositions by Sam Jones except as indicated
 "Unit 7" - 4:49  
 "Come Rain or Come Shine" (Harold Arlen, Johnny Mercer) - 4:05  
 "'Round Midnight" (Thelonious Monk) - 5:31  
 "O.P." - 5:07  
 "Thumbstring" (Ray Brown) - 4:31  
 "Down Home" - 4:08  
 "Strollin'" (Horace Silver) - 4:12  
 "Falling in Love With Love" (Lorenz Hart, Richard Rodgers) - 7:03

Personnel
Sam Jones - double bass (tracks 1 & 5), cello (tracks 2-4 & 6–8)
Les Spann - flute (tracks 3, 4 & 8)
Snooky Young (tracks 1 & 5), Blue Mitchell (tracks 1, 2, 5 & 7), Clark Terry (tracks 2 & 7) - trumpet 
Jimmy Cleveland - trombone (tracks 1, 2, 5 & 7)
Frank Strozier - flute (track 6), alto saxophone (tracks 1, 2, 5 & 7)
Jimmy Heath - tenor saxophone (tracks 1, 2, 5 & 7)
Pat Patrick - baritone saxophone, flute (tracks 1, 2, 5 & 7)
Ernie Wilkins - arranger (tracks 1, 2, 5 & 7) 
Wynton Kelly (tracks 2 & 7), Joe Zawinul (tracks 1, 3-6 & 8) - piano 
Ron Carter (tracks 2, 6 & 7), Israel Crosby (tracks 3, 4 & 8) - double bass
Vernel Fournier (tracks 3, 4 & 8), Ben Riley (tracks 1, 2 & 5–7) - drums

References 

Riverside Records albums
Sam Jones (musician) albums
1962 albums
Albums produced by Orrin Keepnews